Jack Poplin (November 18, 1920 – October 15, 2007) was an American art director. He was nominated for an Academy Award in the category Best Art Direction for the film The Slender Thread.

Selected filmography
 The Slender Thread (1965)

References

External links

1920 births
2007 deaths
American art directors
People from Los Angeles